was a former Japanese military employee. Drafted in 1937, he was sent to China in order to gain information for the Imperial Japanese Army, but went missing, eventually being declared dead in 1963.  He was found living in the Chinese province of Henan in 1993, suffering from amnesia, and returned to Japan that year.
 
In 1993, a Hyogo-based civilian group got information about a Japanese man living in Henan Province. DNA testing identified the man as Ishida. He returned to Japan the same year.

His family said Ishida had been suffering from amnesia after receiving a bullet wound to the head during the war.

He died of pneumonia in 2009.

References

 

1912 births
2009 deaths
Japanese military personnel of World War II
People with amnesia
Deaths from pneumonia in Japan